The 1949 World Snooker Championship was a snooker tournament held at the Leicester Square Hall in London, England.

For the third year running the final was contested by Fred Davis and Walter Donaldson. Davis became the second player to defend his first world title after Joe Davis in 1928 by defeating Donaldson 80–65 in the final, although he had taken a winning lead of 73–58 on the previous day. The match was still in the balance with the score at 63–58 before Davis won 10 frames in a row to take the title. Donaldson made the highest break of the tournament with 115 on the last day of his semi-final match against John Pulman.

Schedule

Final
For the third consecutive year, the final was contested by Donaldson and Davis. The match started on 25 April, as the best-of-145 frames. Donaldson took a 7–5 lead on the first day. He was still two frames ahead, 13–11, after the second day, but the third day finished with the players level at 18–18. Donaldson regained a two-frame lead (25–23) the next day, and increased his lead to 34–26 on 29 April.

Davis had reduced his deficit, at 33–39, by the end of day 6, and made a break of 102 in the last of those frames; It was the only century break of the match. Donaldson maintained a six frame lead (45–39) after the next day of play. Davis then took eight of twelve frames on 3 May, including all six frames in the earlier of the two sessions, to lead 49–47. He moved a further two frames ahead on both of the next two days, and led 63-57. By taking ten of the twelve frames on 6 May, in what the reporter for The Times called "his best form of the match", Davis achieved a decisive lead of 63–58. After 13 s on 7 May, the final score Davis 80–65 to Davis.

The championship trophy was presented by Aubrey Ellwood, Air Officer Commanding-in-Chief Bomber Command. Snooker historian Clive Everton noted that several of the sessions took more than three hours and wrote that "caution was the watchword".

Main draw
Results of the main tournament were are follows.

Qualifying
John Barrie withdrew for business reasons, giving Herbert Holt a bye into the final of the qualifying event. Conrad Stanbury beat Herbert Francis 18–17 in his first round match played from 10 to 12 February 1949 and then beat Jackie Rea by the same score in a match played from 14 to 16 February. Stanbury then played Holt in the final of the qualifying from 17 to 19 February and recorded his third 18–17 victory, winning the exciting final frame. All three matches were at Leicester Square Hall.

References

1949
World Snooker Championships
World Snooker Championships
World Snooker Championship